The following is a list of sovereign states that have Persian as an official language.

Official language

Significant minority language

Historical language

Indian subcontinent

The Persian language in the Indian subcontinent, before the British colonized it, was the region's lingua franca and a widely used official language in north India and Pakistan. The language was brought into the Indian subcontinent by various Turkic, Persian and Afghan dynasties, in particular the Turko-Afghan Delhi Sultanate and the Mughal Dynasty. Persian held official status in the court and the administration within these empires and it heavily influenced many of the local languages, particularly Urdu and to some extent modern standard Hindi.

Evidence of Persian's historical influence there can be seen in the extent of its influence on the languages of the Indian subcontinent. Many of these areas have seen a certain influence by Persian not only in literature but also in the speech of the common man. Persian exerted a strong influence on Balochi (an Iranian language) and Urdu, and a relatively strong influence on Pashto (another Iranian language), Punjabi and Sindhi. Other languages like Hindi, Marathi, Gujarati, Rajasthani and Bengali also have a considerable amount of loan words from Persian.

Persian's official status was replaced with English in 1835 by British East India Company. After 1843, Hindustani and English gradually replaced Persian in importance in the Indian subcontinent as the British had full suzerainty over the Indian subcontinent.

Ottoman Empire
Persian was one of the influential languages of the Ottoman Empire along with Ottoman Turkish and Arabic. It was initially used by the educated in northern portions of the Ottoman Empire before being displaced by Ottoman Turkish. Throughout the vast Ottoman bureaucracy Ottoman Turkish language was the official language, a version of Turkish, albeit with a vast mixture of both Arabic and Persian grammar and vocabulary. Educated Ottoman Turks spoke Arabic and Persian, as these were the main foreign languages in the pre-Tanzimat era, with the former being used for science and the latter for literary affairs.

The spread of the Persian language through Rumi shrines made it the dialect of the Sufism. the Ottomans promoted and supported the Persian language. The reborn evolution of the Persian etymology and its impact on the Turks’ literature and culture reached perfection in the Ottoman Royal Court and the Sufis’ Khanqahs. Sultan Bayezid II (1448- 1512), was in correspondence with the divines and the men of letters of Khorasan, including the poet Jami.

See also
 List of countries where Arabic is an official language

References